ABC Kids World (formerly known as Wiggles World) is a themed land at the Dreamworld amusement park on the Gold Coast, Queensland, Australia. The area is dedicated to the shows and characters from various shows that air on ABC Kids.

The area originally opened as Wiggles World on 17 September 2005 replacing the previous Gum Tree Gully section.

History

During July 2005, Gum Tree Gully was closed to aid in the construction of Dreamworld's second children's area, Wiggles World. Only a narrow corridor remained for pedestrian access during the construction period. On 17 September 2005 Wiggles World officially opened to the public with a performance by The Wiggles. Based on the musicians of the same name, the area was the first of several to be installed at theme parks around the world.

On the first anniversary of the opening of the area, Dreamworld added Dorothy's Rosy Tea Cup Ride.

In mid-2012, Dreamworld announced that they would be adding a new ride to Wiggles World. It was later revealed to be the Big Red Boat Ride. The ride was officially opened on 14 December 2012 with 7 members of The Wiggles in attendance.

In May 2015, following the successful ten-year partnership with the band, Dreamworld announced that Wiggles World would oversee a complete overhaul, expansion, and would be renamed to ABC Kids World. Alongside a majority of the Wiggles attractions, brand new attractions based on Giggle and Hoot, Play School, and Bananas in Pyjamas would be added. The "Wiggles World" name would be kept for the Wiggles section of the themed area, with its sign being moved nearer to the Wiggles attractions. The newly refurbished area opened on June 27, 2015.

Attractions

Current

Former

Shopping and dining
In addition to the attractions, ABC Kids World is home to a merchandise shop, food outlets and a photo store. The merchandise stores are:

 ABC Kids Shop (formerly known as The Wiggles Shop) - sold merchandise based on ABC Kids characters. Since late 2020, the shop has been standing but not operating for unknown reasons. The store is still listed on the park's website, however it is currently unknown when the store will reopen.
 Ready, Teddy, Go! - was a photo store located in the building formerly housing The Yummy Yummy Food Outlet, which closed at an unknown date. The store has been closed since 2018.

The food outlets are:
 Full of Beans - was a cafe which sold snacks and hot beverages. The café served as the main food outlet in ABC Kids World after the Yummy Yummy food outlet closed. The café has been closed since 2018.
 The Billabong Buffett Restaurant - is located right next to the former Big Red Car Ride, however is listed as part of the Dreamworld Corroboree.

Character appearances
ABC Kids World gives guests the chance to meet with many costumed characters from the different shows featured in the area.

Characters who can be seen in the park include B1 & B2 from Bananas in Pyjamas, Giggle & Hoot from their titular show, and Shirley Shawn the Unicorn, Dorothy the Dinosaur, Wags the Dog, Henry the Octopus and Captain Feathersword from The Wiggles.

From time to time, live presenters from Play School and the ABC Kids strand (alongside The Wiggles) make appearances and performances at the park to advertise the area.

Gallery

Wiggles-themed areas at other amusement parks
On 12 December 2006, American-based amusement park operator Six Flags released plans to partner up with The Wiggles to add Wiggles World themed-areas to some of their parks. In 2007, Six Flags Great Adventure, Six Flags Great America, and Six Flags New England all opened a Wiggles World at their park. This was followed by Great Escape in 2008 and Six Flags Fiesta Texas in 2009.

In late 2010, Six Flags terminated licenses with various brands including The Wiggles. This saw the areas rethemed to the generic KIDZOPOLIS theme, while  Great Adventure rethemed their Wiggles World as Safari Kids.

References

External links
 

Amusement rides introduced in 2005
Themed areas in Dreamworld (Australia)
Dreamworld (Australia)
The Wiggles